The Broken Hills is a range of low-lying mountains and ridges in northern Fauquier County, Virginia.

The range begins just to the west of the southern Bull Run Mountains, north of Warrenton, Virginia and continues westward to the eastern edge of Blue Ridge Mountain. Interstate 66 and Virginia State Route 55 run just north of the range, while US-211 runs to the south.  The stretch of US-17 between Warrenton and Marshall traverses the range.

The Broken Hills form the southern border of the Loudoun Valley.

Notable mountains
Wildcat [Wild Cat-1865,1914 Map] Mountain []
Rappahanock [Rappahannock-1865,1914 Map] Mountain []
Pignut [Pig Nut-1865 Map] Mountain []
Prickly Pear Mountain []
Viewtree [View Tree-1865,1914 Map] Mountain []
Swains Mountain []
Thumb Run Mountain []
Waters [Watery-1865,1914 Map] Mountain []
Piney Mountain []

References

Mountains of Fauquier County, Virginia
Mountain ranges of Virginia